Indirect parliamentary elections were held in Burundi in 1957.

Background
The Decree of 14 July 1952 by the Belgian authorities had introduced an element of democracy to the Burundian political system. A complicated electoral system was created, which involved seven stages of elections to eventually elect the National Superior Council.

The elections began in the sub-chiefdoms, then were held in the chiefdoms, then the territories, and finally at the national level.

Results
The elections in the sub-chiefdoms in 1956, with the elections to the Chiefdom Councils, Territorial Councils and the Superior Council following in 1957. The number of Tutsis elected to all bodies increased, whilst the number of elected Hutus decreased in comparison with the 1954 elections.

References

1957 elections in Africa
1957 in Burundi
1957